Artur Janosz (born 16 June 1993) is a Polish racing driver.

Career

Karting
Born on 16 June 1993 in Pszczyna, Janosz began karting in 2010 in the local Senior category of the Rotax International Open, in which he became 24th. This is the only registered karting championship in which he competed.

Euroformula Open
Janosz graduated to the European F3 Open Championship, with Campos Racing, in 2013. He finished in the points three times: in the second race in Spa-Francorchamps and both races in Monza. He became 13th in the championship with 16 points.

Janosz remained in the series, now renamed as the Euroformula Open Championship, with RP Motorsport. He finished as runner-up in the championship 89 points behind teammate Sandy Stuvik, who won a staggering eleven out of sixteen races.

GP3 Series
In 2015, Janosz will move up to GP3 with Trident.

Racing record

Career summary 

† As Janosz was a guest driver, he was ineligible to score points.
* Season still in progress.
Notes

Complete GP3 Series results
(key) (Races in bold indicate pole position) (Races in italics indicate fastest lap)

Complete Formula V8 3.5 Series results
(key) (Races in bold indicate pole position) (Races in italics indicate fastest lap)

References

External links
  
 }

1993 births
Living people
People from Pszczyna
Sportspeople from Silesian Voivodeship
Polish racing drivers
Euroformula Open Championship drivers
FIA Formula 3 European Championship drivers
GP3 Series drivers
World Series Formula V8 3.5 drivers
FIA Motorsport Games drivers

Blancpain Endurance Series drivers
International GT Open drivers
Campos Racing drivers
RP Motorsport drivers
Trident Racing drivers
Euronova Racing drivers
Team Lazarus drivers
EuroInternational drivers